This is a list of international presidential trips made by Igor Dodon, the former President of Moldova.

Summary of Trips 
Since he took office in December 2016 he has made:

 One visit to Greece, Hungary, Italy, Japan, Kyrgyzstan, Tajikistan, the United Arab Emirates, United States and Vatican City.
 Two visits to Armenia, Azerbaijan, France, Iran, Israel and Turkmenistan
 Three visits to Belarus, Belgium, Germany, and Transnistria.
 Four visits to Turkey.
 Twenty-one visits to Russia.

2017

2018

2019

2020

Gallery

References 

Dodon
Politics of Moldova
Dodon
Diplomatic visits by heads of state